South Vacherie is a census-designated place (CDP) in St. James Parish, Louisiana, United States. The population was 3,543 at the 2000 census. In French, the name defines a cattle range for grazing.

Geography
South Vacherie, is located at  (29.936670, -90.694230).

According to the United States Census Bureau, the CDP has a total area of 15.5 square miles (40.2 km), all land.

South Vacherie is known more popularly among locals as "Back Vacherie." Officially, both North Vacherie and South Vacherie are known overall as "Vacherie." North Vacherie is locally known as "Front Vacherie." The "unofficial" divider is Louisiana Highway 3127 which runs through the town from east to west. Another divider that is commonly accepted for the dividing line of Front Vacherie and Back Vacherie is St Patrick's St which runs east to west approximately 1 1/8 miles south of LA Hwy. 3127.

Demographics

As of the census of 2000, there were 3,543 people, 1,233 households, and 976 families residing in the CDP. The racial makeup of the CDP was 67.94% White, 31.64% African American, 0.03% Asian, 0.14% from other races, and 0.25% from two or more races. Hispanic or Latino of any race were 0.25% of the population.

There were 1,233 households, out of which 38.2% had children under the age of 18 living with them, 63.5% were married couples living together, 11.5% had a female householder with no husband present, and 20.8% were non-families. 18.3% of all households were made up of individuals, and 8.8% had someone living alone who was 65 years of age or older. The average household size was 2.87 and the average family size was 3.28.

In the CDP, the population was spread out, with 26.6% under the age of 18, 10.1% from 18 to 24, 30.7% from 25 to 44, 21.6% from 45 to 64, and 11.0% who were 65 years of age or older. The median age was 36 years. For every 100 females, there were 94.8 males. For every 100 females age 18 and over, there were 93.7 males.

The median income for a household in the CDP was $41,490, and the median income for a family was $53,053. Males had a median income of $37,857 versus $21,724 for females. The per capita income for the CDP was $17,241. About 11.8% of families and 14.3% of the population were below the poverty line, including 18.0% of those under age 18 and 14.6% of those age 65 or over.

Education
St. James Parish Public Schools operates public schools. St. James High School is located in Vacherie. Vacherie Elementary School in South Vacherie serves the community.

References

External links
St. James High School Wildcats

Census-designated places in Louisiana
Census-designated places in St. James Parish, Louisiana